Chrysocoris eques is a species of shield-backed bugs belonging to the family Scutelleridae.

Distribution
This species can be found in India, Indonesia, Sumatra and Myanmar.

References

Scutelleridae
Hemiptera of Asia
Insects described in 1794